High Bonnybridge is a small village which lies in the Falkirk council area of Scotland. High Bonnybridge sits north of the main Glasgow to Edinburgh via Falkirk railway line.

At the time of the 2001 census the village had a population of 610 residents.

References

External links

Canmore - High Bonnybridge, Firebrick Works site record

Villages in Falkirk (council area)